Libby McArthur (born in Castlemilk, Glasgow) is a Scottish actress known for her portrayal of Gina Hamilton in soap opera River City, a character she played from the show's inception in September 2002 until November 2013. Other television appearances include Taggart, Take The High Road, Rab C. Nesbitt and Looking After Jo Jo. In the early 80s she was a founder member of pop group Sophisticated Boom Boom who had a number of John Peel sessions.

McArthur played the part of Dolly in the 30th anniversary touring production of Tony Roper's The Steamie in the Autumn of 2017.

References

External links

Living people
Scottish television actresses
Actresses from Glasgow
Year of birth missing (living people)
Scottish soap opera actresses